Ipiko (Epai, Higa, Ipikoi) is a Papuan language of Papua New Guinea, the most divergent of the Inland Gulf languages. Despite being spoken by only a few hundred people, language use is vigorous. It is spoken in Ipiko and Pahemuba villages, with Ipiko village being located in Amipoke ward, Baimuru Rural LLG, Kikori District, Gulf Province.

Bibliography
Word lists
Chance, Sydney H. 1926. Vocabulary of Ipikoi. British New Guinea Annual Report 1925–1926: 91–91.
Petterson, Robert. 1999. Rumu – English – Hiri-Motu Dictionary. Palmerston North, New Zealand: International Pacific College.
Z’graggen, John A. 1975. Comparative wordlists of the Gulf District and adjacent Areas. In: Richard Loving (ed.), Comparative Wordlists I. 5–116. Ukarumpa: SIL-PNG. (Rearranged version of Franklin ed. 1973: 541–592) with typographical errors.)

References

Inland Gulf languages
Languages of Papua New Guinea